The Portland Exposition Building, also known as The Expo, is a sports and exhibition venue (convention center) building complex in Portland, Maine. The complex includes five inter-connected buildings with 24,000 square feet of exhibition space and 10 meeting rooms. It is adjacent to the Hadlock Field and the Portland Ice Arena.

Phish, Ani Difranco, Natalie Merchant, The Monkees, and Rusted Root have played at the venue. It has also hosted trade shows and celebrations. It has been used for the Maine Red Claws basketball team, Portland High School Bulldogs basketball games, and indoor track events. In 2007, the Expo became the home of Maine Roller Derby. Locker rooms for Fitzpatrick Stadium, the visiting clubhouse for Hadlock Field as well as the Portland High School locker rooms are located downstairs.

Home to over 270 events per year, the Portland Exposition Building hosts trade shows, concerts, sporting events, conferences, civic meetings, brew fests, High school indoor track meets, ski shows and other special events. Nearly 600,000 patrons pass through the Expo's turnstile each year.

History

The Portland Exposition Building was designed by Frederick A. Tompson and was built in 1914 at a cost of $80,944. It is the second oldest arena in continuous operation in the United States (behind Matthews Arena in Boston, Massachusetts).

The building was considered a sophisticated facility sure to "put Portland on the map". Its grand opening—a major agricultural show on June 7, 1915 in which the local daily newspaper dedicated the entire front page to covering the event.

In addition to the cavernous first floor arena, the basement level featured the Cafe Dumont. "The Cafe D" was a full service nightspot that offered "Top international entertainment in a classy nightclub atmosphere."

In September 2007, Maine Roller Derby began hosting flat-track roller derby bouts, with opponents traveling from Montreal, Ohio, New Jersey, New York, New Hampshire, Rhode Island, Massachusetts and Connecticut. The season runs from late April through November, with most bouts occurring April–June.

In 2008, a group of local business people signed a deal to bring an NBA Development League team to the Portland Exposition Building as well as to renovate the arena's facilities. It was confirmed, and the Expo Building is home to the Maine Red Claws, beginning play for the 2009–10 season.

Notable events and visitors 
Over the years, many notable figures have appeared at the Expo, including Babe Ruth, Rudolph Valentino, Rocky Marciano, President John F. Kennedy, President Barack Obama and Paavo Nurmi. It has hosted significant performances including the first East Coast concert of the Beach Boys (1963), James Brown, Dolly Parton, Janis Joplin, Queen (1974), the 60th Anniversary Ball of the Portland Symphony Orchestra, world championship kickboxing, and gala banquets for the Senior's Pro Golf Tournaments featuring Arnold Palmer and Gary Player.

See also
Augusta Civic Center
Cross Insurance Arena
Merrill Auditorium

References

External links 
Portland Exposition Building
https://obamawhitehouse.archives.gov/photos-and-video/photos/president-obama-portland-maine

Basketball venues in Maine
Maine Red Claws
Music venues in Portland, Maine
NBA G League venues
Sports venues in Portland, Maine
Sports venues completed in 1914